Soumaïla Konaré (born 22 July 1991), commonly known as Sumy, is a Malian footballer who plays for Gibraltar National League side Lynx as a midfielder.

Club career
Born in Kati, Sumy joined Albacete Balompié's youth setup in 2009 from Mora CF. After making his senior debuts with the reserves in the Tercera División, he was definitely promoted to the main squad in August 2010.

Sumy made his first-team debut on 11 September 2010, coming on as a second-half substitute for David Sousa in a 2–1 home win against Granada CF in the Segunda División. He appeared in 11 matches during the campaign, as Alba suffered an immediate relegation.

On 25 January 2012, after being rarely used, Sumy was loaned to Celta de Vigo B until June and with an obligatory buyout clause. In August he signed a four-year deal with Tunisian side Club Africain, but in November returned to his first club Mora.

On 20 August 2013 Sumy moved to CD Madridejos, in the fourth tier. On 9 July 2015 he signed a one-year deal with Segunda División B side Guadalajara; after being rarely used, he returned to his former club Madridejos in October.

References

External links

1991 births
Living people
Malian footballers
Association football midfielders
Segunda División players
Segunda División B players
Tercera División players
Atlético Albacete players
Albacete Balompié players
Celta de Vigo B players
CD Guadalajara (Spain) footballers
Lynx F.C. players
Club Africain players
Malian expatriate footballers
Expatriate footballers in Spain
Expatriate footballers in Tunisia
People from Koulikoro Region
21st-century Malian people